The Land of Lost Content is a museum in Craven Arms, Shropshire, that collects everyday objects such as toys, magazines and packaging.

The museum's name is taken from Poem XL in A. E. Housman's collection A Shropshire Lad.

History
The museum was founded by Stella Mitchell, who had begun collecting everyday objects while studying art in Birmingham in the 1970s. She opened her first museum in 1991 with her husband Dave in West Sussex, before moving to Craven Arms in 2003. The current premises is the town's former market hall, constructed in 1888, which the couple bought for £165,000. It contains 37 separate displays spread out over four floors.

In 2018, the museum was threatened with closure because it did not meet modern safety standards. The owners retrofitted the premises with additional fire doors and extinguishers.

Collections
Objects in the museum include a variety of Chad Valley toys, bluebirds taken from the gates of the Blue Bird Toffee factory, tickets from the first National Lottery in 1994 and a Sinclair C5.

The museum is run without any funding or sponsorship and has relied on word of mouth to build a reputation for its collections and displays. All of the museum's objects were popular and in everyday use at some point since the late Victorian era. Though many items were mass-produced with no perceived value when collected by the museum, they have since acquired significance as they are attached to visitors' personal memories and a view to how people used to live.

Donations
The Land of Lost Content has donated objects in its collections to various other museums and exhibitions. These include a 50th anniversary commemoration of the Festival of Britain in 2011, supplying 1930s posters to the Black Country Living Museum and furnishing a flat with contemporary objects in Balfron Tower as part of a National Trust display of Brutalist architecture in 2014.

See also
 Museum of Brands

References

External links
 Official website
 The Land of Lost Content Museum - Birmingham Mail

Museums in Shropshire
Museums established in 1991
Tourist attractions in Shropshire
Craven Arms